William Cokkes (died 1512) was a Canon of Windsor from 1500 – 1512.

Career
He was appointed:
Rector of St Magnus-the-Martyr, London Bridge 1480
Rector of St Margaret, New Fish Street 1472 – 1512
Queen's Chaplain

He was appointed to the first stall in St George's Chapel, Windsor Castle in 1500, and held the stall until 1512.

Notes 

1512 deaths
Canons of Windsor
Year of birth missing